The Drug Control Agency, also called the National Drug Enforcement Agency, is the drug control service of Tajikistan. Formed in 1999, the service was founded to help combat the drug trafficking through the country from Afghanistan, and is one of the most active anti-narcotics bodies operating in Asia.

History

It is estimated that upwards of 20% of Afghanistan's opiates travel through Tajikistan. Between 2000 and 2011, the agency confiscated over 11,000 kilograms of drugs. It cooperates with law enforcement bodies of Iran, Kyrgyzstan, Russia, China, Afghanistan, and Uzbekistan. In 2004, the head of the agency, Ghaffor Mirzoyev, was sentenced to life imprisonment for drug trafficking. He was replaced by Lieutenant General Rustam Nazarov.

References

Government of Tajikistan
Drugs in Tajikistan
Drug control law enforcement agencies
Law enforcement in Tajikistan